Paul Forbes Bowser (May 28, 1886 – July 17, 1960) was a professional wrestling promoter who was active from the 1920s to the 1950s in the Boston area.

Wrestler
Bowser grew up on a farm in western Pennsylvania and attended Beaver College before becoming a professional wrestler and touring with the Pollock Brothers Circus. He moved to Newark, Ohio in 1912 and began to promote wrestling shows, often working as a referee. In 1913 he married women's wrestling champion Cora Livingstone. That same year, he opened a wrestling school in Newark.

On March 10, 1916, Bowser became world middleweight champion, defeating Joe Turner in Newark. In November 1919, he and a co-defendant were successfully sued by Kelton Mitchell, who claimed he had been conned out of $2,300 that was bet on a fixed wrestling match in 1917.

Bowser moved to Boston in 1922, running shows against the area's established promoter, George V. Tuohey. Within a year, Bowser had won the promotional war and Tuohey filed for bankruptcy. In Boston, on January 3, 1922, Bowser again won the middleweight title from Joe Turner in a show promoted at the Boston Opera House. He retired as a wrestler the following year.

Promoter
As a promoter, Bowser was initially allied with Billy Sandow and Ed "Strangler" Lewis and took on entrenched rival, New York-based Jack Curley. On January 25, 1923, Curley-backed Nat Pendleton was defeated in a real contest by Bowser's John Pesek, taking two falls in under 45 minutes. Curley would get his revenge two years later, paying Stanislaus Zbyszko to go against plans and defeat Sandow/Lewis/Bowser-backed world champion Wayne Munn in Philadelphia. On March 11, 1926, Bowser planned to regain control of the title by having Joe Malcewicz ambush champion Joe Stecher (who had won the title from Zbyszko and was also aligned with Curley)—who was expecting to wrestle a different opponent. But the plan failed when Stecher just walked out of the ring and left before the match started.

In 1928, Bowser put his promotional efforts behind Gus Sonnenberg, an NFL football player for the Providence Steam Roller. Sonnenberg and his flying tackle became a sensation in professional wrestling and, on January 4, 1929 at the Boston Garden, promoted by Bowser, Sonnenberg became the world heavyweight champion, defeating Strangler Lewis. Sonnenberg became the biggest draw in professional wrestling, although he would soon be eclipsed by Jim Londos, wrestling's biggest star during the Great Depression. Sonnenberg consistently drew big crowds in Los Angeles for promoter Lou Daro—part of the Bowser camp. His popularity also led Bowser-aligned Ivan Mickailoff to introduce weekly wrestling shows to Toronto in 1929, largely using Bowser's wrestlers.

In 1930, Bowser created the American Wrestling Association and also recruited amateur wrestling standout Ed Don George, who was immediately put in main events and, on December 10, 1930, defeated Sonnenberg for the world title in Los Angeles. Lewis, who felt he had been promised that he would be the one to get the title back from Sonnenberg, defeated George for the belt on April 13, 1931 in Los Angeles, against Bowser's wishes. But Bowser quickly regained control of the title when on May 4, 1931 in Montreal, Lewis was disqualified for biting his opponent, Henri DeGlane, who was declared the new champion. The suspicion at the time was that the bite marks were actually inflicted by DeGlane himself or one of his cornermen, and that he pretended to have been bitten by Lewis to win the match, although it was never confirmed.

During the promotional wars of the 1930s, Toots Mondt and Ray Fabiani, supported by Curley, began presenting shows in Boston in opposition to Bowser, running their first event on January 27, 1932 with Lewis in the main event. But after Londos broke away from Curley, peace was made between Bowser and Curley in the summer of 1932. In 1933, Bowser backed Jim Browning, who defeated Lewis in New York for recognition there as world champion, with Bowser reportedly paying $42,000 to Lewis and Mondt to drop the title. In November 1933, Bowser signed an agreement with Curley, Mondt, Fabiani, Ed White and Tom Packs, under which the six promoters agreed to share talent and profits.

Bowser's next star creation was Danno O'Mahoney, who unified the New York and Boston versions of the world title in June and July 1935 with wins over Londos and George, respectively. O'Mahoney was not a skilled wrestler and promoters who had not been shut out of the Curley-Bowser alliance took advantage of that weakness, arranging for Dick Shikat to win the title in a doublecross on March 2, 1936 in New York. The "Curley Trust" began to fall apart after Shikat's victory, with Fabiani eventually running in opposition to Curley.

Later in 1936, Bowser made Steve "Crusher" Casey his top star, and Casey rose to become world champion with a victory over Lou Thesz in Boston on February 11, 1938. Bowser brought Maurice Tillet to the U.S. in 1940, and he became the largest draw in professional wrestling and defeated Casey for the Boston area world title on May 13, 1940. Casey regained the title two years later and served in the United States Army during World War II and returned to wrestling for Bowser in Boston in 1945, dropping the title to Bowser's next major star, Frank Sexton.

Bowser did not initially join the National Wrestling Alliance when it formed in 1948, but considered himself to be a friend of the organization and sent the NWA a check for initiation fees. In 1952, as a concession to the NWA, Bowser renamed his world title the Eastern Heavyweight Championship. Verne Gagne became a top draw for Bowser in the early 1950s.

In the late 1950s, Bowser hired Johnny Doyle to handle all booking responsibilities at the Boston wrestling office. Doyle left to go into partnership with Jim Barnett and Bowser ran what would be his last show on July 15, 1960 at the Boston Garden. He had suffered a heart attack three days earlier and died on July 17 following surgery at Massachusetts General Hospital at age 74.

Personal life
Bowser was a resident of Lexington, Massachusetts and owned a substantial estate. Included in this was an old racetrack and "trotting park." His brick mansion still stands at 171 Grant Street.

Awards and accomplishments
Professional Wrestling Hall of Fame and Museum
Class of 2021
Wrestling Observer Newsletter awards
Wrestling Observer Newsletter Hall of Fame (Class of 2006)

See also
List of professional wrestling promoters

References

External links

1886 births
1960 deaths
American male professional wrestlers
Professional Wrestling Hall of Fame and Museum
Professional wrestling promoters
Sportspeople from Boston